Riddiculous is a British game show that has aired on ITV since 24 October 2022 and is hosted by Ranvir Singh with Henry Lewis starring as 'The Riddlemaster'. The show features contestants answering general knowledge questions before facing riddles from Lewis.

Gameplay 
Three teams of two start by answering general knowledge questions, whereby they have to be the first to press their buzzer and state the answer.

In Round 1, questions are worth £50 each and answers share a theme; in the first round of the first episode, they all started with the letter E. Pairs have to answer three questions correctly to unlock a riddle, which if answered correctly, is worth £100. After four riddles, the lowest-scoring team is eliminated.

In Round 2, questions are worth £100 and riddles are worth £250. Questions again share a theme; in the first episode, answers all contained a food. This time, after three questions with themed answers, players may pick among three visual multiple choice riddles from a description, for example, the choice could be animals, letters or numbers. However, only one of the pair can answer the riddle. If it is answered incorrectly, the opposing pair may answer it for £125.

In Round 3, questions are worth £150, riddles are worth £500 and thrown-over riddles are worth £250. Questions again share a theme; in the first episode, answers were all six letters long. After three riddles have been posed, the highest-scoring pair progresses to the Final.

In the Final, the winning team faces Henry's Riddle Run, where they have a minute to answer six rebus riddles to win their bank; should they do so, they may take on one further double-or-nothing rebus riddle, for which they have 20 seconds. However, if they fail to solve this one within the time limit, they lose all their money but instead take home a Riddiculous teacup and saucer as a consolation prize.

References

External links 
 
 

2022 British television series debuts
2020s British game shows
ITV game shows
English-language television shows